The Homemaker is a 1919 British silent romance film directed by George Dewhurst and starring Manora Thew, Basil Gill and Gwynne Herbert.

Cast
 Manora Thew as Lysbeth  
 Basil Gill as Wilbur Benson  
 Gwynne Herbert as Lady Sturdy  
 Peggy Patterson as Esther  
 Jeff Barlow 
 Lottie Blackford 
 Nessie Blackford

References

Bibliography
 Robert B. Connelly. The Silents: Silent Feature Films, 1910-36. December Press, 1998.

External links
 

1919 films
1910s romance films
British romance films
British silent feature films
Films directed by George Dewhurst
Films set in England
British black-and-white films
1910s English-language films
1910s British films